Campbell Morrison (born William Morrison; 21 June 1952 – 10 January 2008) was a Scottish actor.

He played one of the main characters, Drew Lockhead in the soap opera Eldorado and also appeared in EastEnders playing DCI Charlie Mason.  Morrison was a member of the Royal Shakespeare Company in the early eighties.

Other roles included Police Constable Eustace Oates in Jeeves & Wooster and Gordon Gallagher in the Sky One series Dream Team.

He had two sons, Tom and Luke, from a previous marriage, and a daughter, Lily, with his wife, Nicki Ballantyne.

Filmography

Film

Television

References

External links 
 

1952 births
2008 deaths
Scottish male television actors
Royal Shakespeare Company members